Danilo Rafael dos Santos Vivaldo (born 12 January 1987 in São Paulo, Brazil), simply known as Danilo Vivaldo, is a Brazilian footballer who plays as a defender. He is currently unattached.

Formerly, he played for Kedah FA in the Malaysia Super League for the 2012 season. His contract was terminated, along with another Kedah import player Daniel Baroni after only five games into the season. In that period, Danilo himself only played one game for Kedah before suffering an injury in training.

Danilo also have played for semi-professional clubs, Associação Atlética Portuguesa (Santos) and Londrina Esporte Clube between 2005 and 2010. He also had a short stint with the Bangladesh team, Brothers Union.

References

1987 births
Living people
Brazilian footballers
Association football defenders
Kedah Darul Aman F.C. players
Footballers from São Paulo

ja:マルケン・ヌケン・ゴンサルヴェス・フェレイラ